Qudsia Arshad is a Pakistani politician who served as member of the National Assembly of Pakistan.

Political career
She was elected to the National Assembly of Pakistan as a candidate of Pakistan Muslim League (N) on a seat reserved for women from Punjab in the 2008 Pakistani general election.

References

Living people
Year of birth missing (living people)
Pakistani MNAs 2008–2013